Church of Scientology Celebrity Centres are Churches of Scientology that are open to the general public but are intended for "artists, politicians, leaders of industry, and sports figures".

The Celebrity Centre International was established in Los Angeles, California in 1969 by Yvonne Gillham and Heber Jentzsch in the Château Élysée, a 1920's building that had been built to replicate a 17th century French-Normandy chateau.

Other Celebrity Centre organizations have since been established around the USA and in Europe. As of 2022, there were ten Celebrity Centres open: Los Angeles, Las Vegas, Nashville and New York in the USA, and Vienna, Düsseldorf, Munich, Florence, and two in Paris in Europe.

Critics of Scientology point to L. Ron Hubbard's launch of "Project Celebrity" in 1955 to recruit celebrities into the church, and that the centres were established as an extension of this initial purpose.

Though the Church of Scientology denies the existence of a policy to recruit high-ranking celebrities, The New York Times reported, "internal church documents show that their primary purpose is to recruit celebrities and use the celebrities' prestige to help expand Scientology," and the Los Angeles Times wrote, "The Church of Scientology uses celebrity spokesmen to endorse L. Ron Hubbard's teachings and give Scientology greater acceptability in mainstream America."  Mike Argue of the band Chester said, "We made a lot of money for the church", referring to the original Celebrity Centre in Los Angeles which attracted "a boatload of notables" in the 1970s.

Violent incident 
On November 23, 2008, Mario Majorski arrived at the Los Angeles Celebrity Centre wielding dual samurai swords and threatening to injure people. Majorski was shot by Celebrity Centre security guards, and was later pronounced dead at Los Angeles County-USC Medical Center. Police regard the guards' actions as justifiable. Majorski was a Scientologist in the early 1990s; however, he left the group fifteen years prior to the incident, according to church spokesperson Tommy Davis. When he was still a member of the church, Majorski had filed lawsuits, later dismissed, against Louis West, a psychiatrist who was critical of Scientology.

See also
Scientology and celebrities
Château Élysée

References

External links

 
  (2022 version)

Religious organizations established in 1969
Scientology organizations
Organizations based in Los Angeles